Windhoek is the capital and largest city of Namibia. The population of Windhoek in 2020 was 431,000 which is growing continually due to a continued migration from other regions in Namibia.

Windhoek is the social, economic, political, and cultural centre of the country. Nearly every Namibian national enterprise, governmental body, educational and cultural institution is headquartered there.

The city developed at the site of a permanent hot spring known to the indigenous pastoral communities. It developed rapidly after Jonker Afrikaner, Captain of the Orlam, settled there in 1840 and built a stone church for his community. In the decades following, multiple wars and armed hostilities resulted in the neglect and destruction of the new settlement. Windhoek was founded a second time in 1890 by Imperial German Army Major Curt von François, when the territory was colonised by the German Empire.

History

Etymology
Theories vary on how the place got its modern name of Windhoek. Most believe it is derived from the Afrikaans word wind-hoek (wind corner). Another theory suggests that Captain Jonker Afrikaner named Windhoek after the Winterhoek Mountains at Tulbagh in South Africa, where his ancestors had lived. The first known mention of the name Windhoek was in a letter from Jonker Afrikaner to Joseph Tindall, dated 12 August 1844.

Pre-colonial
In 1840 Jonker Afrikaner established an Orlam settlement at Windhoek. He and his followers stayed near one of the main hot springs, located in the present-day Klein Windhoek suburb. He built a stone church that held 500 people; it was also used as a school. Two Rhenish missionaries, Carl Hugo Hahn and Franz Heinrich Kleinschmidt, started working there in late 1842. Two years later they were driven out by two Methodist Wesleyans, Richard Haddy and Joseph Tindall. Gardens were laid out and for a while Windhoek prospered. Wars between the Nama and Herero peoples eventually destroyed the settlement. After a long absence, Hahn visited Windhoek again in 1873 and was dismayed to see that nothing remained of the town's former prosperity. In June 1885, a Swiss botanist found only jackals and starving guinea fowl amongst neglected fruit trees.

Colonial era

A request by merchants from Lüderitzbucht resulted in the declaration  in 1884 of a German protectorate over what was called German South West Africa (Deutsch-Südwestafrika), now Namibia. The borders of the German colony were determined in 1890 and Germany sent a protective corps, the Schutztruppe under Major Curt von François, to maintain order. Von François stationed his garrison at Windhoek, which was strategically situated as a buffer between the warring Nama and Herero peoples. The twelve strong springs provided water for the cultivation of produce and grains.

Colonial Windhoek was founded on 18 October 1890, when von François fixed the foundation stone of the fort, which is now known as the Alte Feste (Old Fortress).
After 1907, development accelerated as indigenous people migrated from the countryside to the growing town to seek work. More European settlers arrived from Germany and South Africa. Businesses were erected on Kaiser Street (presently Independence Avenue), and along the dominant mountain ridge over the city. At this time, Windhoek's three castles, Heinitzburg, Sanderburg, and Schwerinsburg, were built.

South African administration after World War I
The German colonial era came to an end after the end of World War I but South West Africa, and with it Windhoek, already fell in 1915. Until the end of the war the city was administered by a South African military government, and no further development occurred. In 1920, after the Treaty of Versailles, the territory was placed under a League of Nations Class C mandate and again administered by South Africa.

After World War II more capital became available to improve the area's economy. After 1955, large public projects were undertaken, such as the building of new schools and hospitals, tarring of the city's roads (a project begun in 1928 with Kaiser Street), and the building of dams and pipelines to stabilise the water supply. The city introduced the world's first potable re-use plant in 1958, treating recycled sewage and sending it directly into the town's water supply. On 1 October 1966 the then Administrator of South West Africa granted Windhoek the coat of arms, which was registered on 2 October 1970 with the South African Bureau of Heraldry. Initially a stylized aloe was the principal emblem, but this was amended to a natural aloe (Aloe littoralis) on 15 September 1972. The Coat of Arms is described as "A Windhoek aloe with a raceme of three flowers on an island. Crest: A mural crown Or. Motto: SUUM CUIQUE (To each their own)".

Windhoek formally received its town privileges on 18 October 1965 on the occasion of the 75th anniversary of the second foundation of the town by von François.

Since Namibian independence
Since independence in 1990, Windhoek has remained the national capital, as well as the provincial capital of the central Khomas Region. Since independence and the end of warfare, the city has had accelerated growth and development.

Economy 
The city is the administrative, commercial, and industrial center of Namibia. A 1992/93 study estimated that Windhoek provides over half of Namibia's non-agricultural employment, with its national share of employment in utilities being 96%, in transport and communication 94%, finance and business services 82%. Due to its relative size Windhoek is, even more than many other national capital cities, the social, economic, and cultural centre of the country. Nearly every national enterprise is headquartered here. The University of Namibia is, too, as are the country's only theatre, all ministry head offices, and all major media and financial entities. The governmental budget of the city of Windhoek nearly equals those of all other Namibian local authorities combined. Of the 3,300 US$-millionaires in Namibia, 1,400 live in Windhoek.

Transport

Road

Windhoek's three main access roads from Rehoboth, Gobabis, and Okahandja are paved, and are designed to be able to withstand the largest possible flood to be expected in fifty years.

In 1928, Kaiserstraße, now Independence Avenue, was the first paved road in Windhoek. Ten years later the next one, Gobabis road, now Sam Nujoma Drive, was also paved.

In 2014, The Roads Authority has planned to upgrade the Windhoek-Okahandja  road to a dual carriageway. It costs about N$1 billion and is expected to be completed in 2021. Later on, they also plan to upgrade the Windhoek and Hosea Kutako International Airport to a dual carriageway. This is expected to be completed in 2022.

As everywhere in Namibia, public transport is scarce and transportation across town is largely done by taxi; there were 6,492 registered taxis in 2013.

Air
A number of foreign airlines operate to and from Windhoek. Air charters and helicopter and fixed-wing aircraft rentals are also available.

Hosea Kutako International Airport handles over 800,000 passengers a year. It has one runway without capacity limitations. The other international airport is located in Walvis Bay, with domestic airports at Lüderitz, Oranjemund and Ondangwa.

Eros Airport is the busiest airport in Namibia in terms of take offs and landings. This city airport handles approximately 150 to 200 movements per day (around 50,000 per year). In 2004, the airport served 141,605 passengers, the majority of which are light aircraft. Primarily, limitations such as runway length, noise, and air space congestion have kept Eros from developing into a larger airport. Most of Namibia's charter operators have Eros as their base.

Rail

Windhoek is connected by rail to:

 Okahandja (north)
 Rehoboth (south)
 Gobabis (east)

Geography

Expanding the town area has – apart from financial restrictions – proven to be challenging due to its geographical location. In southern, eastern and western directions, Windhoek is surrounded by rocky, mountainous areas, which make land development costly. The southern side is not suitable for industrial development because of the presence of underground aquifers. This leaves the vast Brakwater area north of town the only feasible place for Windhoek's expansion.

Windhoek's City Council has plans to dramatically expand the city's boundaries such that the town area will cover . Windhoek would become the third-largest city in the world by area, after Tianjin and Istanbul, although its population density is only 63 inhabitants per square kilometre.

Suburbs
Windhoek is subdivided into the following suburbs and townships:

 Academia
 Auasblick
 Avis 
 Cimbebasia
 Dorado Park
 Donkerhoek
 Elisenheim 
 Eros
 Eros Park
 Freedom Land
 Groot Aub (since September 2017)
 Greenwell Matongo
 Goreangab
 Hakahana
 Havanna
 Hochland Park
 Katutura
 Khomasdal
 Kleine Kuppe
 Klein Windhoek
 Lafrenz Industrial Area
 Ludwigsdorf
 Luxury Hill (Luxushügel) 
 Maxuilili 
 Northern Industrial Area
 Okuryangava
 Olympia
 Ombili
 Otjomuise
 Pionierspark
 Prosperita
 Rocky Crest
 Southern Industrial Area
 Suiderhof
 Tauben Glen
 Wanaheda
 Windhoek Central
 Windhoek North
 Windhoek West

In many of Windhoek's townships residents live in shacks. In 2020 the city had a total of 41,900 of these informal housing structures, accommodating close to 100,000 inhabitants.

Climate
Windhoek has over 300 sunny days per year. It experiences a hot semi-arid climate (BSh) according to Köppen climate classification as the annual average temperature is above . The temperature throughout the year would be called mild, due to altitude influence. Due to its location near the Kalahari Desert, the city receives 3,605 hours of sunshine. Precipitation is abundant during the summer season, and minimal during the winter season.

Demographics
In 1971, there were roughly 26,000 whites living in Windhoek, outnumbering the black population of 24,000. About one third of white residents at the time, at least 9,000 individuals, were German speakers. Windhoek's population  stands at over 325,858 (65% black; 18% other; 17% white), and is growing 4% annually in part due to informal settlements that have even higher growth rates of nearly 10% a year. In public life, Afrikaans, and to a lesser extent German, are still used as lingua francas even though the government only uses English. Currently Windhoek has an population of 431,000 as of 2020.

Politics

Local authority elections
Windhoek is the only self-governed settlement in Khomas Region. It is governed by a multi-party municipal council that has fifteen seats. The council meets monthly; its decisions are taken collectively.

SWAPO won the 2015 local authority election and gained twelve seats, by having 37,533 votes. Three opposition parties gained one seat each: The Popular Democratic Movement (PDM), formerly DTA, with 4,171 votes, the National Unity Democratic Organisation (NUDO) with 1,453 votes, and the Rally for Democracy and Progress (RDP) with 1,422 votes. SWAPO also won the 2020 local authority election but lost the majority control over the town council. It obtained 20,250 votes and gained five seats. The Independent Patriots for Change (IPC), an opposition party formed in August 2020, obtained 14,028 votes and gained four seats. Two seats each went to the local branch of the Affirmative Repositioning movement (8,501 votes) and the Landless People's Movement (LPM, a new party registered in 2018, 7,365 votes). PDM (5,411 votes) and NUDO (1,455 votes) obtained one seat each.

Twin towns and sister cities

Windhoek is twinned with:

 Berlin, Germany
 Havana, Cuba
 Johannesburg, South Africa
 Kingston, Jamaica
 Nanjing, China
 Richmond, United States
 San Antonio, United States
 Shanghai, China
 Suzhou, China
 Trossingen, Germany

Culture

Windhoek is known as the art capital of Namibia. The National Art Gallery, National Theatre and the National Museum are all located here. Two locations are part of the National Museum, the Alte Feste (historical) showcases a range of colonial items such as wagons and domestic items, while the Owela Museum (scientific; named after Owela, a traditional game played with pebbles) contains displays of minerals, fossils and meteorites and gives an insight into traditional village life. There are also the Independence Memorial Museum, the National Library of Namibia and the Windhoek Public Library, built in 1925, next to the Alte Feste.

Places of worship 

The places of worship are predominantly Christian churches and temples: those of Evangelical Lutheran Church in Namibia, Evangelical Lutheran Church in the Republic of Namibia, German-speaking Evangelical Lutheran Church in Namibia (all three members of the Lutheran World Federation), Baptist Convention of Namibia (Baptist World Alliance), Assemblies of God, Roman Catholic Archdiocese of Windhoek (Catholic Church). There are also a few Islamic mosques in the city, including the Windhoek Islamic Center.

Architecture

 Alte Feste – (Old Fortress) Built in 1890, today houses the National Museum.
 Curt von François monument in front of the municipality building. Inaugurated on 18 October 1965 on the occasion of the 75th anniversary of the second foundation of the town by von François. The statue was removed of its location, in front of the municipal grounds, on the 23 November 2022 and will be stored in the local Windhoek City Museum.
 Heroes' Acre - A national war and heroes memorial, about 10 km outside of the city.
 Independence Memorial Museum (Namibia) - A historical museum focusing on the anti-colonial resistance and the national liberation movement of the Republic of Namibia.
 National Council (Namibia) - The upper chamber of Namibia's bicameral Parliament.
 Reiterdenkmal (Equestrian Monument), a statue celebrating the victory of the German Empire over the Herero and Nama in the Herero and Namaqua War of 1904–1907 The statue has been removed from its historical place next to Christuskirche in December 2013 and is now on display in the yard of the Alte Feste.
 State House, Windhoek - The official residence of the President of Namibia.
 Supreme Court of Namibia – situated in Michael Scott Street on Eliakim Namundjebo Plaza. Built between 1994 and 1996 it is Windhoek's only building erected post-independence in an African style of architecture.
 The three castles of Windhoek built by architect Wilhelm Sander: Heinitzburg, Sanderburg, and Schwerinsburg
 Tintenpalast – (Ink Palace) within Parliament Gardens, the seat of both chambers of the Parliament of Namibia. Built between 1912 and 1913 and situated just north of Robert Mugabe Avenue.
 Turnhalle – neo-classicist building of Wilhelmine architecture, inaugurated in 1909.
 Windhoek Railway Station - A historical railway station serving the city of Windhoek .
 Zoo Park – a public park on Independence Avenue in downtown Windhoek. The current park is landscaped and features a pond, playground and open-air theatre.

Sport
Rugby is a popular sport in Namibia, and the national team is called the Welwitchias. Namibia has made the Rugby World Cup on six occasions, in 1999, 2003, 2007, 2011, 2015 and 2019, but has never won a game.

The city has several football clubs which include African Stars F.C., Black Africa F.C., F.C. Civics Windhoek, Orlando Pirates F.C., Ramblers F.C. and SK Windhoek, Tigers F.C., Tura Magic F.C., Citizens F.C.

Many boxers such as Paulus Moses, Paulus Ambunda and Abmerk Shindjuu are from the city.

The Namibia national cricket team, the Eagles, plays the majority of its home games at the Wanderers Cricket Ground. It has also played at other grounds in the city, including the United Ground and the Trans Namib Ground. The team took part in the 2003 Cricket World Cup in South Africa, though they lost all their games. They have played in each edition of the ICC Intercontinental Cup.

Men's baseball was introduced to Namibia in 1950 at the Ramblers sports club in town.

The 'Tony Rust Raceway' is located west of Windhoek on the Daan Viljoen road, and reopened in 2007. Farm Windhoek, located adjacent to the townlands and owned by the municipality, is a sports venue for hiking, running, and mountain biking.

Education

Tertiary institutions
The general institutions of higher education in Windhoek are:
 University of Namibia (UNAM)
 Namibia University of Science and Technology (NUST), until 2015 the Polytechnic of Namibia
 International University of Management (IUM)

Other institutions
Other recognisable institutions of higher learning:
 Institute of Information Technology (IIT)
 College of the Arts (COTA)

Secondary schools
Windhoek  29 secondary schools and 58 primary schools. Some of the notable schools are:

 A. Shipena Secondary School
 Academia Secondary School
 Augustineum Secondary School
 Centaurus High School
 Concordia College
 Cosmos High School
 Chairman Mao Zedong High School
 Dagbreek School for the Intellectually Impaired
 David Bezuidenhout Secondary School
 Delta Secondary School Windhoek (DSSW)
 Deutsche Höhere Privatschule (DHPS)
 Ella du Plessis High School
 Eros School for Girls
 Hage Geingob High School
 Holy Cross Convent School
 Immanuel Shifidi Secondary School
 Jakob Marengo Secondary School
 Jan Jonker Afrikaner High School
 Jan Möhr Secondary School
 Saint George's Diocesan College
 Pionier Boys' School
 Saint Paul's College
 Windhoek Afrikaanse Privaatskool (WAP)
 Windhoek Gymnasium Private School (WHK Gym)
 Windhoek High School (WHS)
 Windhoek International School (WIS)

Notable people
 

Frank Fredericks, (born 1967), Namibian athlete
Michelle McLean, (born 1973), Miss Universe 1992
Quido (Le-Roy Quido Mohamed), (born 1989), Namibian rapper

See also
 List of mayors of Windhoek
 List of cemeteries in Windhoek

References

Bibliography

External links

 Official homepage of the City of Windhoek

 
Populated places in the Khomas Region
Regional capitals in Namibia
German South West Africa
1840 establishments in South West Africa
Populated places established in 1840
Cities in Namibia
Capitals in Africa